The South Africa cricket team toured New Zealand from 21 to 27 October 2014. The tour consisted of three One Day International matches, which South Africa won 2-0. With the series win, South Africa moved to the top of the ODI ranking table for the first time in five years.

Squads

ODI series

1st ODI

2nd ODI

3rd ODI

References

External links
Series home at ESPNcricinfo

2014 in New Zealand cricket
2014 in South African cricket
2014-15
International cricket competitions in 2014–15
2014–15 New Zealand cricket season